Niphona vicina is a species of beetle in the family Cerambycidae. It was described by Charles Joseph Gahan in 1896.

References

vicina
Beetles described in 1896